"I'm Gonna Be Alright" is a song by Jennifer Lopez.

I'm Gonna Be Alright may also refer to:
"I'm Gonna Be All Right", song performed by Donna Loren, and written by Nancie Mantz and Dave Burgess in 1962
"I'm Gonna Be Alright", song by Prince Markie Dee from the 1992 album Free

See also
It's Gonna Be Alright (disambiguation)